Tillandsia × floridana is a natural hybrid (T. fasciculata × T. bartramii) of the genus Tillandsia. This plant is endemic to the state of Florida in the United States.

References

floridana
Endemic flora of Florida
Plants described in 1967
Plant nothospecies